"Easy Living" (1937) is a jazz standard written by Ralph Rainger and lyrics by Leo Robin for the film Easy Living where it was the main theme of the score but not sung. A popular recording in 1937 was by Teddy Wilson with Billie Holiday, Benny Goodman, and Lester Young.

A multitude of other artists have also recorded the song.

See also
List of 1930s jazz standards

References

1937 songs
1930s jazz standards
Songs with lyrics by Leo Robin
Songs with music by Ralph Rainger
Billie Holiday songs
The Coasters songs